Sergei Petrovich Mitrofanov (25 September 1915 – 24 October 2003) was a Russian scientist in the field of industrial engineering.

Career 
Graduated from the Technical School of Precise Mechanics and Optics in 1933 and Institute of Precise Mechanics and Optics with a specialisation in Precise Mechanics in 1939.

From 1939 till 1951 had been working in LOMO and occupied positions of Engineer, Head of Technical Office, Head of the Production, Senior Technologist. Lived through Siege of Leningrad, awarded Order of the Patriotic War in 1992.

Creator of Group Components Processing Method.

Over the 1951 to 1961 period took significant part in the political work. Became The First Secretary of Communist Party District Committee. In 1954 received position of Science and Engineering Secretary of Communist Party District Committee.

From 1961 Sergei Mitrofanov took important part in LITMO live. He had been occupying Rector position from 1961 till 1974. Also he was the Head of the Tool Engineering Department (1961–89). In 1962 he was elected professor of the Tool Engineering Department.

Received PhD Degree in Technical Science in 1953 and became Doctor Nauk in 1961. Was Chief Scientist of USSR Ministry of the Defence Engineering (1962). Became Academician of Saint-Petersburg Engineering Academy in 1992. Awarded degree of Honoured master of sciences and engineering. Author of more than 20 monographs.

The most important scientific results:
 S. P. Mitrofanov, Science basis of Group Components Processing Method 
 S. P. Mitrofanov, Yu. A. Gulnov, D. D. Kulicov Automatization of Technological Processes in Serial Production, Moscow, 1974.
 S. P. Mitrofanov, Yu. A. Gulnov, D. D. Kulicov ECM Usage in Production Technology, Moscowm 1981.
 S. P. Mitrofanov, D. D. Kulikov, O. N. Milayev, B. S. Padun, Technology of Flexible Production Schemes Preproduction, St. Petersburg, 1987.

Awards and recognitions 
Awarded Order of Lenin (1957), Order of the Badge of Honour (1967), Order of Honour (Russia)(2000). Awarded Lenin Prize for development and application of Group Technology Method (1959).

References

1915 births
2003 deaths
Academic staff of ITMO University
Soviet engineers
Engineers from Saint Petersburg